Mirinaba jaussaudi is a species of air-breathing land snail, a terrestrial pulmonate gastropod mollusk in the family Strophocheilidae. This species is endemic to Brazil, found in states of Paraná and São Paulo.

References

Strophocheilidae
Endemic fauna of Brazil
Gastropods described in 1937